The Oak Grove Cemetery is a historic cemetery, founded in 1854, which is bounded by Derby, Washington, and Grove Sts., and Maplewood Avenue in Gloucester, Massachusetts.  The cemetery was founded by a group of local businessmen who sought to establish a cemetery in the then-fashionable rural cemetery style.  They hired landscape architects Robert Morris Copeland and Horace William Shaler Cleveland to lay out a series of winding lanes.  The Bradford Chapel was built through a bequest by George R. Bradford, another local businessman, and built in 1903–04.  The cemetery is still privately owned, and has grown over time to occupy .

It is the burial place of the operatic soprano Emma Abbott (1850–1891).

The cemetery was listed on the National Register of Historic Places in 1975.

See also
National Register of Historic Places listings in Gloucester, Massachusetts
National Register of Historic Places listings in Essex County, Massachusetts
 Find-A-Grave

References

Historic districts on the National Register of Historic Places in Massachusetts
Cemeteries on the National Register of Historic Places in Massachusetts
Buildings and structures in Gloucester, Massachusetts
Cemeteries in Essex County, Massachusetts
National Register of Historic Places in Essex County, Massachusetts
Rural cemeteries
Cemeteries established in the 1850s
1854 establishments in Massachusetts